Alt Rosenthal station is a railway station in the municipality of Vierlinden in the Märkisch-Oderland district of Brandenburg, Germany.

References

Railway stations in Brandenburg
Railway stations in Germany opened in 1954
Buildings and structures in Märkisch-Oderland